The timeline of the Seljuk Sultanate of Rum (1077–1307) is summarized below.

Background 

After the battles of Pasinler in 1048 and Malazgirt in 1071 Turks founded a number of states in Anatolia. These were the vassals of Great Seljuk Empire. In fact one of the most powerful of these vassal states had been founded by a member of Seljuk house and the name of this state was the Sultanate of Rum.

The founder of the state was Süleyman I. Paternal grandfathers of the sultan Melik Shah of Great Seljuk Empire and Suleyman I were brothers. But soon, the Seljuks of Rûm began to act independently of the Great Seljuk Empire and annexed the territories of other Turkish states in Anatolia. Their history is notable for: 
They were adversaries of the first three Crusades.
Ottoman principality, the future Ottoman Empire emerged within their realm.

11th century

12th century

13th century

14th century

See also 
Timeline of Turks (500-1300)
Timeline of Turkish history

References 

Sultanate of Rum
Turkic timelines
Turkey history-related lists